The Saint Vincent and the Grenadines Green Party is a green political party in Saint Vincent and the Grenadines. The party is currently led by Ivan O'Neal, and has no seats in the House of Assembly.

The party was formed on 10 January 2005. In the elections that year the party fielded four candidates in the 15 constituencies, but received just 34 votes and failed to win a seat. In the 2010 elections the party received 145 votes, but remained seatless.

Electoral history

House of Assembly elections

References

External links
Official website

Green political parties
Political parties in Saint Vincent and the Grenadines